Söğüt is a town (belde) in the Çavdır District, Burdur Province, Turkey. Its population is 3,097 (2021).

References

Towns in Turkey
Populated places in Çavdır District